The Office of Minority Health (OMH) is an American federal agency created in 1986. It is one of the most significant outcomes of the 1985 Secretary's Task Force Report on Black and Minority Health, also known as the "Heckler Report". The Heckler report "was a landmark effort in analyzing and synthesizing the present state of knowledge [in 1985] of the major factors that
contribute to the health status of Blacks, Hispanics, Asian/Pacific Islanders, and Native Americans." The Office the Heckler Report established is dedicated to improving the health of racial and ethnic minority populations through the development of health policies and programs that will help eliminate health disparities. OMH was reauthorized by the Patient Protection and Affordable Care Act of 2010 (P.L. 111-148).

How OMH works: OMH works in partnership with communities and organizations in the public and private sectors. These collaborations support a systems approach for eliminating health disparities, national planning to identify priorities, and coordinated responses through focused initiatives. OMH provides funding to state offices of minority health, multicultural health, and health equity; community and faith-based organizations, institutions of higher education, tribes and tribal organizations; and other organizations dedicated to improving health.

National Partnership for Action to End Health Disparities (NPA)
The purpose is to improve nationwide cohesion and coordination of strategies and actions to eliminate health disparities and achieve health equity. The NPA has five goals:
increasing awareness;
strengthening leadership at all levels;
improving health and healthcare outcomes;
improving cultural and linguistic competence; and
improving data availability, and coordination, utilization, and diffusion of research and evaluation outcomes.

OMH Resource Center
The OMH Resource Center is a one stop shop for minority health literature, research, and referrals. The center also provides technical assistance to community organizations on HIV/AIDS.

Cultural and Linguistic Competency: OMH is committed to culturally and linguistically competent systems that will ensure the needs of minority communities are integrated and addressed within health-related programs across the nation.

References

External links
 Official website

Medical and health organizations based in Maryland
Government agencies established in 1986
Office of the Assistant Secretary for Health
Race and health in the United States